Hiram Paine Hunt (May 23, 1796 – August 14, 1865) was a U.S. Representative from New York.

Born in Pittstown, New York, Hunt attended the public schools and was graduated from Union College, Schenectady, New York, in 1816.
He studied law at the Litchfield Law School.
He was admitted to the bar in May 1819 and commenced practice in Pittstown, New York.
He served as town clerk of Pittstown in 1822.
He moved to Lansingburgh, New York, in 1825 and to Troy, New York, in 1831, where he continued the practice of law.

Hunt was elected as an Anti-Jacksonian candidate to the Twenty-fourth Congress (March 4, 1835 – March 3, 1837).
He was an unsuccessful candidate for reelection in 1836 to the Twenty-fifth Congress.

Hunt was elected as a Whig to the Twenty-sixth and Twenty-seventh Congresses (March 4, 1839 – March 3, 1843).
He was not a candidate for renomination in 1842.
He resumed the practice of his profession in Troy, New York.
He moved to New York City and continued the practice of law until his death on August 14, 1865.

Sources

1796 births
1865 deaths
Union College (New York) alumni
New York (state) National Republicans
National Republican Party members of the United States House of Representatives
Whig Party members of the United States House of Representatives from New York (state)
19th-century American politicians
People from Lansingburgh, New York
Politicians from Troy, New York
People from Pittstown, New York